Lene Espersen (born 26 September 1965) is a former Danish politician, a former leader of Conservative People's Party and a former Minister of Justice. She is the current CEO at the Danish Association of Architectural Firms. From 1 July 2016 to June 30, 2020, she served as chairman of the board of Aalborg University.

In 2006, Espersen was stripped of her parliamentary immunity after crashing into a woman on a scooter. She was subsequently banned from driving and fined €150.

Early life
Born to a fisherman father and a book-keeper mother, she grew up with her younger sister in Hirtshals in the north of Jutland, on Denmark’s mainland. She attended Lester B. Pearson United World College of the Pacific in Canada. She later became the first in her family to graduate from university.

Political career
Espersen was the first person in her family to join a political party. A member of the Folketinget from 1994, she served as Minister of Justice from 27 November 2001 to 10 September 2008 and as Minister of Economic and Business Affairs from 10 September 2008 to 23 February 2010.

Espersen served as Minister of Foreign Affairs from 23 February 2010 to 3 October 2011, making her Denmark’s first female foreign minister and the only woman in such a post in the EU at the time.

Espersen was the leader of the Conservative People's Party and was Deputy Prime Minister from 9 September 2008 to 13 January 2011.

On 13 January 2011, she announced at a press conference at 19.00 pm, briefly after her arrival in Denmark, that she would not continue as leader of the Conservative People's PartyParty. The announcement came after months of increasing pressure, where various issues regarding her work ethics, had gained national attention, and decreasing support in opinion polls for thethe party. During her tenure as political leader, support for the Conservative People's Party was reduced from around 10% to below 5%. On 14 January, Lars Barfoed succeeded Lene Espersen as political leader of the Conservative People's Party.

Other activities
 Trilateral Commission, Member of the European Group
 Baltic Development Forum, Chair (since 2014)
 European Bank for Reconstruction and Development (EBRD), Ex-Officio Member of the Board of Governors (2008-2010)

Political positions
When the Danish newspaper Jyllands-Posten published controversial cartoons of the Prophet Muhammad in 2005, Espersen defended its right to publish and labelled Muslim extremism as more dangerous than climate change. In 2012, in her capacity as foreign minister, she met with 17 ambassadors from Muslim countries as part of efforts to prevent any new cartoon crisis and to foster understanding.

References

Notes

|-

|-

|-

|-

1965 births
Danish Justice Ministers
Foreign ministers of Denmark
Living people
Aarhus University alumni
People educated at a United World College
Conservative People's Party (Denmark) politicians
Female foreign ministers
Danish women business executives
Women nonprofit executives
People from Hirtshals
21st-century Danish women politicians
Female justice ministers
Members of the Folketing 1994–1998
Members of the Folketing 1998–2001
Members of the Folketing 2001–2005
Members of the Folketing 2005–2007
Members of the Folketing 2007–2011
Members of the Folketing 2011–2015
Women members of the Folketing
Women government ministers of Denmark
Danish women diplomats
Leaders of the Conservative People's Party (Denmark)